Fernando Morales Esquer (born September 14, 1985, in Mexico City) also known as El Zurdo  is a Mexican former footballer. He last played as a midfielder for Pumas UNAM of Liga MX.

Morales debuted for Pumas on November 21, 2004, in a defeat game (1-5) against Guadalajara. He was used sparingly by Pumas coach Hugo Sánchez, although he was considered a top prospect. Comparisons were made that Morales was the next Aílton da Silva, a Pumas hero.

He was loaned to Club Necaxa for the Clausura 2007 tournament and returned to Pumas to the Clausura 2008. He is mostly known for his strong left leg. Fernando Morales went on a loan to San Luis in 2012.

Honours
 Mexican Primera División: (3)
Pumas UNAM
  Clausura 2009
  Clausura 2004
  Apertura 2004

External links
 

1985 births
Living people
Liga MX players
Club Universidad Nacional footballers
Club Necaxa footballers
San Luis F.C. players
Footballers from Mexico City
Association football midfielders
Mexican footballers